Edison Gutember Valdivieso De Lucca (born August 10, 1989) is an Ecuadorian football midfielder currently playing for Barcelona.

Clubs

External links
FEF Player card
Barcelona Official Website

1989 births
Living people
Sportspeople from Guayaquil
Association football midfielders
Ecuadorian footballers
Barcelona S.C. footballers
Guayaquil City F.C. footballers
Deportivo Azogues footballers